Kupferman may refer to:

Fred Kupferman (1934–1988), French historian.
Lawrence Kupferman (1909–1982), American artist.
Meyer Kupferman (1926–2003), American composer and clarinetist. 
Moshe Kupferman (1926–2003), Israeli artist.
Theodore R. Kupferman (1920–2003), American politician.